Gordon Francis Joseph Osbaldeston  (April 29, 1930 – March 6, 2019) was a Canadian civil servant.

Early life 
Born in Hamilton, Ontario, he received a Bachelor of Commerce from the University of Toronto in 1952 and a Master of Business Administration from the University of Western Ontario in 1953. He was the gold medalist at St. Michaels College, the University of Toronto and the gold medalist at the Ivey School of Business, University of Western Ontario. He has received honorary degrees of Doctor of Laws from the University of Western Ontario (1984), York University(1984), Dalhousie University(1985), and Carleton University (1987).

In 1981 he was made an Officer of the Order of Canada and was promoted to Companion in 1997.

In 1953, he married Geraldine Margaret Keller of Kitchener, Ontario (deceased). They have four children Stephen, David, Robert and Catherine.

He joined the public service of Canada in 1953. He was posted to São Paulo, Brazil, Chicago, Illinois and Los Angeles, California as a Canadian Government Trade Commissioner. On return to Ottawa in 1964, he served consecutively as Assistant Director, Personnel, Assistant Director, Planning and Executive Director of the Canadian Government Trade Commissioner Service. In 1968, he was appointed Assistant Deputy Minister of the newly formed Department of Consumer and Corporate Affairs. In 1970, he was appointed Deputy Secretary of the Treasury Board in charge of the Program branch. From 1972 to 1973 he was Deputy Minister of the Department of Consumer and Corporate Affairs. From 1973 to 1976 he was Deputy Minister of the Treasury Board. From 1976 to 1978 he was Deputy Minister of the Department of Industry, Trade and Commerce. In 1978 he was appointed Secretary, Minister of State for Economic Development. In 1982 he was Under-Secretary of State for External Affairs. From 1982 to 1985 he was the Clerk of the Privy Council and Secretary to the Cabinet. As such, he served three Prime Ministers, namely, the Right Honourables Pierre Elliott Trudeau, John Turner, and Brian Mulroney.

In 1986, he joined the faculty of the Ivey School of Business and in 1995 he was appointed as a Professor Emeritus.

In 1981, he received the Outstanding Achievement Award of the Public Service. In 1990, he received the Vanier Medal from the Institute of Public Administration of Canada in recognition of outstanding contribution in the field of public administration. In 1977, he was awarded the Queen Elizabeth II Silver Jubilee Medal. In 1992, he was awarded the Commemorative Medal for the 125th anniversary of Canadian Confederation and in 2002, he was awarded The Queen Elizabeth II Golden Jubilee Medal and in 2012 he received the Queen Elizabeth II Diamond Jubilee Medal.

He has been a director of Atomic Energy of Canada Ltd., National Film Board of Canada, Export Development Corporation, Federal Business Development Bank, DeHavilland Aircraft Co., International Development Research Center, The Molson's Co. Ltd., Canada Packers Co. Ltd., DuPont Canada Ltd., Rockwell International Canada, National Bank of Canada, Bell Canada, London Medical Association, Bow Valley Energy Corp., Ellis-Don Ltd., Life Imaging Systems Inc., Great West Lifeco Inc., London Life Insurance Co., Canada Life Insurance Co., and Honorary Director of "Let's Talk Science".

He is the author of Keeping Deputy Ministers Accountable(1988) and Organizing to Govern (1992).

Osbaldeston died on March 6, 2019, in London, Ontario

Honours

 He was sworn in as a Member of the Queen's Privy Council for Canada on 13 February 1986 entitling him to the honorific The Honourable and the post-nominal letters "PC" for Life.
 He has received several Honorary degrees. These include

Honorary Degrees

References

External links
Order of Canada Citation

1930 births
2019 deaths
Companions of the Order of Canada
People from Hamilton, Ontario
University of Western Ontario alumni
University of Toronto alumni
Clerks of the Privy Council (Canada)